Ron P. Gallemore is a registered ophthalmologist with the American Academy of Ophthalmology involved in research and treatment of diseases of the macula and retina.

Career

Gallemore attained his undergraduate degree from the University of California, Irvine, before going on to complete his M.D. at the School of Medicine at the University of California, San Francisco. He completed his Ph.D. in the field of neuroscience and began a career focusing on the physiology and biophysics of retinal function.

In his progression of training he conducted his internship at the Mercy Hospital and Medical Center in San Diego, before going on to undertake his residency at the Jules Stein Eye Institute at the UCLA Medical Center, Los Angeles, where he later became a clinical instructor. He completed his vitreoretinal surgery fellowship at Duke University under Dr. Robert Machemer, known as the founder of modern vitreoretinal surgery.

Gallemore has been the recipient of numerous awards, including the Heed and Knapp Fellowship award, the Dr. Charles Schepens Award, the Dr. Ron Michels Award, and the Jules Stein Eye Institute Alumni Research Award.

He continues to make contributions in the field of diseases of the retina through research, clinical trials, clinical instruction, and public lectures and appearances. In 2007 he founded the Retina Macula Institute where he is currently the principal doctor and surgeon.

Publications

Peer-reviewed papers
Gallemore has published 60 peer-reviewed articles listed in Web of Science. His most cited has been the phase II multi-center study, "Verteporfin therapy of subfoveal minimally classic choroidal neovascularization in age-related macular degeneration – 2-year results of a randomized clinical trial." by Greve, MDJ; Hinz, BJ; Schulha, M, et al. Archives of Ophthalmology 123 (4): 448–457 (2005), Cited 70 times as of June 2009.

Other highly cited papers include:
Gallemore, RP; Jumper, JM; McCuen, BW; Jaffe, GJ; Postel, EA; Toth, CA. . "Diagnosis of vitreoretinal adhesions in macular disease with optical coherence tomography." Retina-the journal of retinal and vitreous diseases 20 (2): 115–120 (2000). Cited 60 times.
Gallemore, RP; Griff, ER; Steinberg, RH. 1988. "Evidence in support of a photoreceptoral origin for the light-peak substance."  Investigative Ophthalmology & Visual Science 29 (4): 566–571.(1988) Cited 49 times
Jaffe, GJ; Yang, CS; Wang, XC; Cousins, SW; Gallemore, RP; Ashton, P. 1998. "Intravitreal sustained-release cyclosporine in the treatment of experimental uveitis." Ophthalmology 105 (1): 46–56. (1998). Cited 47 times
Gallemore, RP; Steinberg, RH. 1990. "Effects of dopamine on the chick retinal-pigment epithelium – membrane-potentials and light-evoked responses". Investigative Ophthalmology & Visual Science 31 (1): 67–80. (1990) Cited 44 times
Gallemore, RP; Steinberg, RH.  "Light-evoked modulation of basolateral membrane Cl− conductance in chick retinal-pigment epithelium – the light peak and fast oscillation" Journal of Neurophysiology 70 (4) 1669–1680  (1993)
Gallemore, RP; Steinberg, RH. Effects of DIDS on the chick retinal-pigment epithelium. 1. Membrane-potentials, apparent resistances, and mechanisms". Journal of Neuroscience 9 (6) 1968–1976 (1989) Cited 42 times.
Gallemore, RP; Steinberg, RH. Effects of DIDS on the chick retinal-pigment epithelium. 2. Membrane-potentials, apparent resistances, and mechanisms. Mechanism of the light peak and other responses originating at the basal membrane". Journal of Neuroscience 9 (6) 1968–1976 (1989) Cited 42 times.

Book chapters

 Hughes, BA, Gallemore, RP and Miller, SS (1998) "Transport mechanisms in the retinal pigment epithelium". In: The retinal pigment epithelium: function and disease. Marmor MF, Wolfensberger TJ, editors. New York: Oxford University Press; p. 103–34.
 Gallemore, RP, Maruiwa, F and Marmor MF (1998) "Clinical electrophysiology of the retinal pigment epithelium". In: M. F. Marmor and T. J. Wolfensberger, eds. The Retinal Pigment Epithelium: Function and Disease.
 Gallemore RP, Hughes BA and Miller SS (1998) "Light-induced responses of the Retinal pigment epithelium". In: M. F. Marmor and T. J. Wolfensberger, eds. The Retinal Pigment Epithelium: Function and Disease.
 Gallemore RP, McCuen B II. (2000) "Silicone oil tamponade in Vitreoretinal surgery". In: S. Ryan ed., Retina, Chapter 127.

References

External links
 Dr. Ron Gallemore biography at the Retina Macula Institute.

American ophthalmologists
1964 births
Living people
University of California, San Francisco alumni